Antonio Selvaggio (born 1 January 1958 in Palermo) is a retired male long-distance runner from Italy.

Biography
He competed for his native country at the 1984 Summer Olympics in Los Angeles, California. He is the twin brother of Piero Selvaggio, also a long-distance runner. Selvaggio set his personal best (13:25.63) in the men's 5,000 metres in 1984.

External links
 

1958 births
Living people
Italian male long-distance runners
Athletes (track and field) at the 1984 Summer Olympics
Olympic athletes of Italy
Italian twins
Sportspeople from Palermo
Twin sportspeople